Gel-e Sorkheh (also Romanized as Gel Sorkheh and Gol Sorkheh; also known as Gelah Sorkheh, Goleh Sorkheh, Qal‘eh Sūrkeh, and Qal‘eh-ye Sorkheh) is a village in Agahan Rural District, Kolyai District, Sonqor County, Kermanshah Province, Iran. At the 2006 census, its population was 302, in 61 families.

References 

Populated places in Sonqor County